Aleksandr Nikolayevich Berketov (24 December 1975 – 1 June 2022) was a Russian professional football player and coach.

Club career
Berketov made his professional debut in the Russian Second Division in 1992 for Tekstilshchik-d Kamyshin. He played one game for the main Tekstilshchik Kamyshin squad in the Russian Cup.

Honours
Rotor Volgograd
 Russian Premier League: runner-up 1997, third place 1996
 Russian Cup: finalist 1995

CSKA Moscow
 Russian Premier League: runner-up 2002
 Russian Cup: 2002

Individual
 Top 33 year-end best players list: 1996, 1997

European club competitions
 UEFA Cup 1994–95 with FC Rotor Volgograd: 1 game.
 UEFA Cup 1995–96 with FC Rotor Volgograd: 3 games.
 UEFA Intertoto Cup 1996 with FC Rotor Volgograd: 5 games, 1 goal.
 UEFA Cup 1997–98 with FC Rotor Volgograd: 6 games, 2 goals.
 UEFA Cup 1998–99 with FC Rotor Volgograd: 2 games.
 UEFA Cup 2002–03 with PFC CSKA Moscow: 1 game.

References

1975 births
2022 deaths
Sportspeople from Volgograd
Russian footballers
Association football midfielders
Association football defenders
Russia under-21 international footballers
Russia youth international footballers
FC Tekstilshchik Kamyshin players
FC Rotor Volgograd players
Russian Premier League players
PFC CSKA Moscow players
Russian football managers